There are around 500,000 to 1,000,000 Protestants in Egypt, with 500,000 to 800,000 being members of the Evangelical Church of Egypt, Pentecostals number 100,000 to 150,000, and various other Protestants scattered in smaller denominations.

List of Protestant denominations
Assemblies of God 
Egyptian Baptist Convention 
Christian Brethren 
Church of God of Prophecy 
Episcopal/Anglican Province of Alexandria
Evangelical Church of Egypt (Synod of the Nile)
Free Methodist (120 churches)
Pentecostal Church of God 
Pentecostal Holiness Church 
Seventh-day Adventist Church

Sources
Religion in Egypt
 .
 .
 .

References